Belgrade, the capital of Serbia, has been host to many important sport events in its history. Some of them include:

1932 European Rowing Championships
1939 Belgrade Grand Prix
1953 nine-pin bowling World Championships
EuroBasket Women 1954
1957 World Women's Handball Championship
EuroBasket 1961
1961 European Amateur Boxing Championships
1962 European Athletics Championships
1963 European Men's Artistic Gymnastics Championships
1969 European Indoor Games (track & field)
1970 Mr. Universe
1973 European Cup Final (football)
1973 World Aquatics Championships
1973 World Women's Handball Championship
1973 European Amateur Boxing Championships
EuroBasket 1975
1975 Men's European Volleyball Championship
1975 Women's European Volleyball Championship
1976 European Football Championship
1977 FIBA European Champions Cup Final (basketball)
1978 World Amateur Boxing Championships
1979 FIBA Korać Cup Final (basketball)
1980 European Weightlifting Championships
1986 Men's European Judo Championships
Belgrade Marathon (annually since 1988) and Belgrade Race Through History (started 1996)
1989 World Judo Championships
Fischer–Spassky (1992 match)
W.A.K.O. European Championships 1996
1998 FIBA EuroCup Final (basketball)
1998 European Karate Championships
W.A.K.O. World Championships 2001 (Belgrade)
2003 European Wrestling Championships
2004 FIBA Diamond Ball
EuroBasket 2005
2005 European Volleyball Championship
2006 European Water Polo Championship (men and women)
2007 European Judo Championships
2007 European Youth Olympic Festival
2007 European Table Tennis Championships
W.A.K.O. World Championships 2007 (Belgrade)
2008 World University Taekwondo Championships
2009 Summer Universiade
2009 World Volleyball League Finals
2010 World Karate Championships
2010 Davis Cup finals
2011 Women's European Volleyball Championship
2011 European Shooting Championships
2011 World Shotgun Championships
2011 Canoe Sprint European Championships
2012 European Handball Championship (men and women)
2012 European Wrestling Championships
2013 LEN Champions League Final Four
2013 World Women's Handball Championship
2013 Davis Cup finals
2013 European Individual Chess Championship for women
2014 FILA Veterans Freestyle and Greco-Roman Wrestling Championship
2014 European Rowing Championships
W.A.K.O. World Championships 2015 (Belgrade)
2016 European Water Polo Championship (men and women)
UEFA Futsal Euro 2016
2017 European Athletics Indoor Championships
2018 EuroLeague Final Four
2018 Canoe Sprint European Championships
EuroBasket Women 2019
2021 AIBA World Boxing Championships

To be held:
2020 European Taekwondo Championships
2021 LEN Champions League Final Eight
2022 LEN Champions League Final Eight
2022 World Athletics Indoor Championships
2023 LEN Champions League Final Eight

References

Events
Sporting events
Lists of sports events
Sporting events in Belgrade
Sporting events in Belgrade